Boo FF is a Swedish football club located in Boo in Nacka Municipality, Stockholm County.

Background
The women's team Boo FF currently plays in Division 2 Södra Svealand which is the second tier of the Swedish football league system. They play their home matches at the Boovallen in Boo.

The men's team play in Division 4 Stockholm Mellersta which is the sixth tier of Swedish football.

The club is affiliated to Stockholms Fotbollförbund.

Season to season Men

Footnotes

External links
 Boo FF – Official website

Football clubs in Stockholm
1981 establishments in Sweden